Isabelle Thériault is a Canadian politician, who was elected to the Legislative Assembly of New Brunswick in the 2018 election. She represents the electoral district of Caraquet as a member of the Liberal Party. She was re-elected in the 2020 provincial election.

Electoral record

References

Living people
New Brunswick Liberal Association MLAs
People from Miramichi, New Brunswick
Women MLAs in New Brunswick
21st-century Canadian politicians
21st-century Canadian women politicians
Acadian people
Year of birth missing (living people)